Alleyton is an unincorporated community in central Colorado County, in the U.S. state of Texas. It adjoins Columbus, Texas.

Geography 
Alleyton is located about 405 meters north of the Colorado River at its closest point. It is bounded on the north by I-10, the south and west by Alleyton Road, and the east by FM-102. Alleyton's elevation stays at approximately 57 meters with a seven-meter decline to the river.

History 
In 1821, the area which would become Alleyton - prehistorically settled by Native Americans - was happened upon by Rawson Alley. Alley was a pioneer settler born to Thomas Alley in 1793, who later surveyed the land which would become the headquarters of Stephen F. Austin's colony. He was granted a league and a half as one of the Old Three Hundred of Austin's colony. This land, five miles south of Columbus, would become Alleyton.

Abraham, John, Thomas, and William Alley (Rawson's brothers) joined him the next year. By 1859, 37 years after the Alleys moved to the area, a railway was extended to meet the property. William donated some of his land for the makings of a town center and was likely responsible for the extension of the railroad.

When the land was surveyed, all lots (besides the Alley home) were auctioned. William worked with the railroad, sharing benefits of the auction, to make Alleyton a functioning town and a roundhouse, depot, and loading facility were built.

In 1860, the railroad was completed, and Alleyton became the largest town in its county. That same year, it received a post office, which is still in use today on Alleyton Road. In 1861, the Civil War started, and Alleyton became an important supply stop for the confederacy. Union forces blockaded the coast of the Gulf of Mexico and with the limited production power of the South, there was a general lack of firepower and military supplies. With the blockades, trade was difficult, so a "cotton road" was established from Alleyton to Mexico, which allowed Rebel armies to export cotton in return for weapons, uniforms, and other supplies. Wagon trains carried the supplies up and down this road, and from the newly established railway in Alleyton, they were further distributed to the South.

When the Civil War ended in 1865, the railway stretched over the newly-bridged Colorado River to the rest of Colorado County (notably Columbus, a few miles north). Alleyton, no longer an important stop for rail goods, became a supply center for the area. Agricultural business in the surroundings required manufactured goods to be shipped into a city center, so Alleyton developed five different general stores and a drugstore. A saloon and two churches served the population of 200 and the nearby farmers by 1890.

Cotton, rice, corn, and pecans served as agricultural output for Alleyton during the early 1900s. It was part of the strip-mining craze that went on in eastern central Texas, and gravel removal destroyed a large portion of farming land. These mines also turned out water features, and there are a selection of unnamed shallow lakes across the railroad tracks from the main town. These are popular for fishing today.

Government regulations on cotton growing and the increased use of synthetic replacements by the 1950s put a damper on the economy of Alleyton, which declined to some 125 people. By 1986, the population fell further to 65. There were six remaining businesses.

In 2000 Alleyton had 165 residents.

In 2017, Alleyton and Columbus shared two churches and a Taco Bell opened between Alleyton and I-10. Koy Concrete also opened in Alleyton on I-10.

Notable residents

Shelly Lee Alley, musician and songwriter
PFC Johnny "Tex" Pilsner, 101st Airborne Division, killed in action during the secret battle of Tam Ky Vietnam on 31 May 1969.

References

External links

Unincorporated communities in Colorado County, Texas
Unincorporated communities in Texas
1859 establishments in Texas